Lhotka nad Labem is a municipality and village in Litoměřice District in the Ústí nad Labem Region of the Czech Republic. It has about 400 inhabitants.

Notable people
Heinz Kindermann (born 1942), German politician

References

Villages in Litoměřice District